Eleven Silent Men is a 2022 Russian sports drama film directed by Alexey Pimanov's company Pimanov and partners. 
The film is the story of the legendary trip of Soviet football players "FC Dynamo Moscow" who came to Great Britain in November 1945 to play in famous English football clubs. It was with this epithet that British journalists dubbed Soviet athletes in the press (ru). 
The film stars Makar Zaporozhsky, Pavel Trubiner, Roman Kurtsyn, Andrey Chernyshov, Evgeniya Lapova, Alyona Kolomina, and Dmitry Belotzerkovsky joining the cast.

Eleven Silent Men is scheduled to be theatrically released on February 17, 2022, by Central Partnership.

Plot 
November 1945. Football Club Dynamo Moscow players fly to London to play a series of matches with hitherto undefeated British teams, including "Chelsea", "Arsenal", and "Rangers". A charming English correspondent decides to create a sensation by falling in love with the best Russian player, and chooses the prettiest "victim" among the Soviet athletes. Local unscrupulous bookmakers also intend to profit from the tour, within the framework of which the games will be visited by hundreds of thousands of fans... But the "eleven silent men", as the British dubbed the local football players, will present many surprises to everyone!

An incredible story based on real events, full of romance, good humor, spy adventures and football passions. Our football players not only did not lose a single match, but also won the hearts of the English public, completely turning its idea of a Russian person and a Soviet country upside down. "Dynamo" became a symbol of the new world, which was born on the ruins of the Second World War.

Cast

Production

Especially for each actor playing a football player, a uniform was sewn, completely identical to the equipment of the athletes of 1945. A soccer ball and boots were recreated, made to order: with special carnations on which spikes were attached.

Filming 
Principal photography began in September 2019 and took place in Moscow, the municipal city of Pavlovsk and Pushkin to the city of Saint Petersburg, the city of Kaluga, Russia, and London, United Kingdom.

Release 
Eleven Silent Men was theatrically released in the Russian Federation on February 17, 2022, by Central Partnership.

Marketing 
The first trailer for the upcoming film was released on November 23, 2021.

References

External links 
 

2022 films
2020s Russian-language films
2020s sports drama films
Russian sports drama films
Russian association football films
Sports films based on actual events
Films set in the United Kingdom
2022 multilingual films
Russian multilingual films